PAS domain-containing protein 1 is a protein that in humans is encoded by the PASD1 gene.

References

Further reading

PAS-domain-containing proteins